This is a list of Canadian films which were released in 1973:

See also
 1973 in Canada
 1973 in Canadian television

References

1973
Canada
1973 in Canada